The Young Greens of Ontario is the youth wing of the Green Party of Ontario.  The organization consists of Green Party of Ontario members who are age 29 or younger, and sends two representatives to the highest governing body in the party, the Provincial Executive.

Additionally, the organization operates campus clubs out of post-secondary institutions in Ontario. Currently, campus clubs exist at the University of Guelph, the University of Ottawa, and Brock University.

References

Green Party of Canada